Robert Leslie Dees (September 26, 1929 – July 5, 1997) was an American football defensive tackle in the National Football League who played for the Green Bay Packers.  Dees played collegiate ball for Southwest Missouri State University before being drafted by the Los Angeles Rams in the 18th round of the 1952 NFL Draft.  He played professionally in the NFL for one season, in 1952.

References

1929 births
1997 deaths
Players of American football from St. Louis
American football defensive tackles
Missouri State University alumni
Green Bay Packers players